Queen's Gate School is a private day school for girls aged 4–18 in Queen's Gate, South Kensington, London, England.

The Good Schools Guide described it as a "Charming popular school, with a mixed intake, which does jolly well by its girls." It is one of a handful of independent girls' schools in the country that does not have a prescribed uniform but girls are expected to abide by a strict dress code.

History
Queen's Gate School was founded in 1891 by Eleanor Beatrice Wyatt (who later founded Heathfield School, Ascot) in her parents' home in nearby Stanhope Gardens. The following year, the School moved to 132 Queen's Gate, later expanding into the adjacent houses at 131 and 133. In May 2005, the school acquired 125/126 Queen's Gate and refurbished it as accommodation for Junior School pupils.

It celebrated its 120th anniversary in 2011, and a special service was held at the local parish church, St Augustine's, Queen's Gate.

Academics
It has a strong academic track record in examinations. In 2011, it placed in the top 100 independent schools nationally for the GCSEs.

Notable former pupils

Camilla, Queen Consort of the United Kingdom
Bryony Gordon journalist 
Susannah Constantine, fashion designer and author
Angela Delevingne, socialite
Belinda Harris-Reid, knit-wear designer and promoter of hand-knitting
Lucinda Lambton, photographer and broadcaster
Emma McQuiston, fashion model 
Nigella Lawson, food writer and television presenter
Imogen Poots, actress
Vanessa Redgrave, actress, socialist and activist
Twinkle, singer
Samantha Robinson, actress
Sophia Swire, business woman
Tilda Swinton, actress
Trinny Woodall, fashion designer
Anya Taylor-Joy, actress

References

External links

Inspection Reports
Profile on ISC website

1891 establishments in England
Educational institutions established in 1891
Private girls' schools in London
Private schools in the Royal Borough of Kensington and Chelsea
Member schools of the Girls' Schools Association